Idol Radio is a South Korean radio show created by MBC Radio specially for idols. It is listenable through MBC Standard FM and watchable through currently MBC Radio's official YouTube channel. Formerly they are viewable via Naver V Live and Universe. The episodes are also available on the radio show's YouTube channel.

History

Season 1
Pilot episodes from July 23, 2018, to July 29, 2018, were aired at 00:05 (KST) for weekday shows and at 00:00 (KST) for weekend shows. Starting September 27, 2018, broadcasting started at 21:00 (KST) on V Live for weekdays only, while broadcasts on MBC Standard FM started on October 8, 2018, airing at 00:00 (KST) every day.

Starting April 1, 2019, the broadcast on MBC Standard FM would start at 01:00 (KST) every day, while the show is accessible via V Live at 21:00 (KST) every day.

Beginning May 11, 2020, the broadcast on MBC Standard FM would start at 00:00 (KST) every day.

From May 18, 2020, the new permanent DJs were Got7’s Youngjae and Day6‘s Young K.

From August 17, the show only aired on weekdays.

On September 15, a notice stated that Season 1 will end on September 25, with Season 2 expected to come.

Season 2
The show announced its planet opening on Universe on July 26, 2021.

Season 2 began from August 9 through Universe, with Monsta X members Joohoney and Hyungwon as the new permanent DJs. It would also air through MBC Radio every Friday and Saturday at 02:00 (KST).

The last episode for Season 2 on Universe was aired on August 25, 2022.

Season 3
Season 3 began on September 12, 2022, with Ateez members Hongjoong and Yunho the DJs for the season.

Airtime

DJ

Current (Season 3)
 Hongjoong (Ateez) (Episode 1-present; absent for episode 16-28, 45-52)
 Yunho (Ateez) (Episode 1-present; absent for episode 16-28, 45-52)

Former

Season 1
Seo Eun-kwang (BtoB) (Episodes 1-6)
Jung Il-hoon (BtoB) (Episodes 7-363; absent in episodes 31, 198, 308)
Youngjae (Got7) (Episodes 594-714)
Young K (Day6) (Episodes 594-714)

Season 2
 Joohoney (Monsta X) (Episode 1-104; absent in episodes 21, 35-43, 81-98)
 Hyungwon (Monsta X) (Episode 2-104; absent in episodes 21, 31, 35-43, 81-98)

Episodes (Pilot)

Note: The broadcast dates stated are based on the schedule in MBC Standard FM; the remarks section will list down the date of recording if it has been pre-recorded. Usually, on weekdays, the episodes are available to watch or listen live on Naver V Live before the official broadcast on MBC Standard FM.

Episodes (Regular 2018)

Note: The broadcast dates stated are based on the schedule in MBC Standard FM; the remarks section will list down the date of recording if it has been pre-recorded. Usually, on weekdays, the episodes are available to watch or listen live on Naver V Live before the official broadcast on MBC Standard FM.

Episodes (Jan-Mar 2019)

Note: The broadcast dates stated are based on the schedule in MBC Standard FM; the remarks section will list down the date of recording if it has been pre-recorded. Usually, on weekdays, the episodes are available to watch or listen live on Naver V Live before the official broadcast on MBC Standard FM.

Episodes (Apr-Jun 2019)

Note: The broadcast dates stated are based on the schedule in MBC Standard FM; the remarks section will list down the date of recording if it has been pre-recorded. Usually, on weekdays, the episodes are available to watch or listen live on Naver V Live before the official broadcast on MBC Standard FM.

Episodes (Jul-Sep 2019)

Note: The broadcast dates stated are based on the schedule in MBC Standard FM; the remarks section will list down the date of recording if it has been pre-recorded. Usually, on weekdays, the episodes are available to watch or listen live on Naver V Live before the official broadcast on MBC Standard FM.

Episodes (Oct-Dec 2019)

Note: The broadcast dates stated are based on the schedule in MBC Standard FM; the remarks section will list down the date of recording if it has been pre-recorded. The episodes are available to watch or listen live on Naver V Live before the official broadcast on MBC Standard FM.Note 2: With Jung Il-hoon (BtoB) having stepped down as DJ, there will be special DJ(s) for every episode.

Episodes (Jan-Mar 2020)

Note: The broadcast dates stated are based on the schedule in MBC Standard FM; the remarks section will list down the date of recording if it has been pre-recorded. The episodes are available to watch or listen live on Naver V Live before the official broadcast on MBC Standard FM.Note 2: With Jung Il-hoon (BtoB) having stepped down as DJ, there will be special DJ(s) for every episode.

Episodes (Apr-Jun 2020)

Note: The broadcast dates stated are based on the schedule in MBC Standard FM; the remarks section will list down the date of recording if it has been pre-recorded. The episodes are available to watch or listen live on Naver V Live before the official broadcast on MBC Standard FM.Note 2: With Jung Il-hoon (BtoB) having stepped down as DJ, there will be special DJ(s) for every episode until May 17, 2020.Note 3: Youngjae (Got7) and Young K (Day6) will be the permanent DJs beginning May 18, 2020.

Episodes (Jul-Sep 2020)

Note: The broadcast dates stated are based on the schedule in MBC Standard FM; the remarks section will list down the date of recording if it has been pre-recorded. The episodes are available to watch or listen live on Naver V Live before the official broadcast on MBC Standard FM.

Episodes (Season 2)

Note: Ha Sung-woon and Jeong Se-woon temporarily stood in as special DJs from episodes 35 until 43 due to Joohoney and Hyungwon's promotional activities with Monsta X in the United States.Note 2: Due to Joohoney and Hyungwon's promotional activities with Monsta X in the United States, Japan and Germany, special DJs will stand in for them from episode 81 to 98.Note 3: After Joohoney and Hyungwon have stepped down as the show's radio DJs on episode 104, special DJ(s) will be in for every episode.

Episodes (Season 3)

Note: Due to Hongjoong and Yunho's overseas activities with Ateez, special DJs would stand in for them from episodes 16 to 28, and from episode 45 to 52.

Concerts

Idol Radio Live in Tokyo (2022)
On October 14, 2022, MBC Radio announced that Idol Radio would hold their first offline concert titled "Idol Radio Live in Tokyo" at the Tokyo Garden Theater on October 20. Youngjae of Got7 (from Season 1), and Joohoney and Hyungwon of Monsta X (from Season 2) will host the show. The lineup consisted of Astro (Jinjin, Rocky, Moon Bin and Sanha), Golden Child, STAYC, and INI, with individual stages by Youngjae and Joohoney. The concert lasted for three hours, with an audience of 7,000 people. After the show, the keyword 'Idol Radio' rose to number six on Japan's Yahoo! trend rankings.

MBC Idol Radio Live in Japan (2023)
On February 25, 2023, MBC Radio announced that Idol Radio would hold their second offline concert titled "MBC Idol Radio Live in Japan" at the Makuhari Messe on April 1-2. The lineup consisted of iKon, Moonbin & Sanha (Astro), Viviz, Oneus, Limelight and n.SSign.

References

Notes

External links
 Idol Radio YouTube Channel

Radio stations in South Korea